Loch Hope is a loch in the Durness parish in Sutherland in the Highland Council Area of northern Scotland. It is located on the A838 main road. The settlements of Hope, Lochside, and Muiseal directly on the loch in addition nearby there's Inverhope, Heilam, Moine House, Alltnacaillich, Strathmore, ect.. The Loch is a large tourist destination for the area around it.

Geography

Rivers 
Flowing out of Loch Hope there's the 1.25 mile (2 km) river hope which flows to Loch Eriboll. Flowing in there's the Strathmore river, which brings water all the way in from Loch Staonsaid and nearly as far as Loch Meadie. A sea of tributaries and temporary brooks and streams bring in the water from the hugely mountainous area and the entire river disperses very quickly. Many other tributaries flow directly into the very long loch some of which split up further.

Mountains 
For starters there's Ben Hope over 900 metres tall and with 700 metres of prominence however the entire area is full of many different mountains many of which bring water into the loch, even as far as Creag Staonsaid for example.

Settlements 
Many settlements are directly on Loch Hope and many others in the catchment area.

Hope 
Hope is by far the most notable of the settlements on the loch and is in itself named after it. It is at the tip of the Loch right where the River Hope starts flowing. The Hope Bridge just north of it is already on the river. There are seven archaeological sites within the settlement and an additional two hut circles just north of the village. The riverside around it is full of weirs, and the settlement boasts a very small permanent population but is one of very few on the loch to have any and is the largest in the area. It has one lodge but it is old and is currently undergoing overhaul with plans for it to become a shooting lodge. There's a small enclosure in the settlement and many paths on the other side of the river bank to Hope, finally there's the ferryman's house on the riverside.

Lochside 
Like most places in Scotland unimaginatively called Lochside, Lochside is on the lochside of Loch hope. It is located just east of the loch on the small stream that is Allt na Raipe and within Lochside there's a sheepfold. There are 2 archaeological sites in Lochside. Aside from the road around the Loch, there's only a couple small trails by the settlement. There are some cottages within Lochside.

Braesgill 
A smaller settlement halfway down the loch,  Braesgill is yet another farmstead located along the lochside of loch hope. It is named after the river it sits on that flows into Loch Hope it is home to 3 archaeological sites including a simple hut circle. Braesgill has been listed by Ordnance Survey since 1871 in Sutherland Volume 12 although it now ceases to appear on their maps.

Merkan 
Merkan is a mostly lost settlement just south of Braesgill, it too is named after the river it sits on but also a nearby small peak with the same name. It has been depicted by Ordnance Survey maps since 1878. It's located just west of the lochside road and a very small carved path links the remains of a building to it. It has an alternate name, Meirgeach.

Muiseal 
Muiseal is another small farmstead, just south of the Loch. It has listings on Openstreetmap and OS and is labelled as a hamlet. It's far more well known than most of the other settlements. Muiseal is surprisingly home to no archaeological sites however two are just south of it. Muiseal is a reference point for many trails and mountains in the area and the brook Allt An Muiseal runs through it giving it its name. It is 11 metres above sea level, there is a parking lot within it to provide for some of the trails in the area, 1 of which goes to Ben Hope. There's another small track which leads to the Strathmore river and on the other side of the river there's a labelled place called Luib Bhan. Finally there's 2 roofed buildings within Muiseal.

Arnaboll 
Arnaboll is a now abandoned farmstead on the other side of Loch Hope, named after a river and hill with the same name. It consists of an intact building and a prehistoric Hut circle. To add to this there's one archaeological site within Arnaboll.

Alltnacaillich 
Alltnacaillich is one of few places near the loch to get a google maps listing. It is a permanently inhabited hamlet on the Strathmore River Just south of Muiseal. There are 7 archaeological sites within Alltnacaillich. There is a sort of central area of the settlement with housing and trails leaving out of it, all this is atop Allt na Caillich a river where the river is named off of unoriginally. Some of these trails lead to peaks and mountains, but most go west towards the Strathmore where there are links to prehistoric sites, a homestead, graveyard and a nature reserve. Alltnacaillich is also home to a bridge over the Strathmore and a burnt mound and nearby there's Don Dornaigil. Despite there being residents there is no form of hotel or lodge in Alltnacaillich. The hamlet has etymology as it means the burn of the ould woman which was actually the naming of the aforementioned river.

Moine House 
Moine house or Moin House is located east of the loch. It has 3 archaeological sites in the area and is near the banks of another loch, Loch Nam Meur Liath which in itself is near to a larger loch, Loch Maovalley which flows into Loch Hope. It consists of one derelict building and a couple trails. It was built as a place of refuge for people travelling on the nearly built road across the area, now the A838 and has lost its roof. The house was also permanently inhabited and due to its importance in helping travelers, it became a marked point on many different maps. Moine means Gaelic for Moss and the house was inhabited by many notable families some of which would have as many as 8 people. The now archaeological site now has a car park for visitors.

Tourism 
On top of there being plans for the abandoned lodge in Hope to be restored into a shooting lodge, there is already a lot of toursim in the area.

References 

Lochs of Highland (council area)
Landforms of Sutherland